dictyBase is an online bioinformatics database for the model organism Dictyostelium discoideum.

Tools
dictyBase offers many ways of searching and retrieving data from the database:
 dictyMart - a tool for retrieving varied information on many genes (or the sequences of those genes).  
 Genome Browser - browse the genes of D. discoideum in their genomic context.

References

External links
 dictyBase

Developmental biology
Model organism databases
Mycetozoa